The following list shows NCAA Division I-A football programs by winning percentage during the 1990-1999 football seasons. The following list reflects the records according to the NCAA. This list takes into account results modified later due to NCAA action, such as vacated victories and forfeits. This list only takes into account games played while in Division I-A.

 

 Chart notes

 Marshall joined I-A in 1997.
 Nevada joined I-A in 1992.
 Idaho joined I-A in 1996.
 UCF joined I-A in 1996.
 UAB joined I-A in 1996.
 Louisiana-Monroe joined I-A in 1994.
 Louisiana-Monroe went by the name Northeast Louisiana until 1999.
 Long Beach State dropped their football program after the 1991 season.
 Louisiana-Lafayette went by the name Southwestern Louisiana until 1999.
 Pacific dropped their football program after the 1995 season.
 North Texas joined I-A in 1995.
 Middle Tennessee joined I-A in 1999.
 Cal State Fullerton dropped their football program after the 1992 season.
 Buffalo joined I-A in 1999.

See also
 NCAA Division I FBS football win–loss records
 NCAA Division I-A football win–loss records in the 1980s
 NCAA Division I FBS football win–loss records in the 2000s

References

Lists of college football team records